Hambury Tout is a large chalk hill by the coast near Lulworth, Dorset, England. It overlooks Lulworth Cove to the west. Hambury Tout is the site of an ancient burial mound.

References

Hills of Dorset